Denial is a 1990 American drama film, written and directed by Erin Dignam. The film features Robin Wright as Sara, a sometime actress, and tall, dark, handsome loner Michael (Jason Patric), as lovers. Michael inhabits the realm of obsessional love with Sara becoming his sickness, as he calls it—or her.

Cast
Robin Wright as Sara/Loon
Jason Patric as Michael
Barry Primus as Jay
Christine Harnos as Sid
Rae Dawn Chong as Julie
Elizabeth Bracco as Lizzie
Rosalind Chao as Terry
Chris Mulkey as Chad
David Duchovny as John
Justin Whalin as Jason

External links
 
 
 

1990 films
1990 drama films
American drama films
American independent films
1990 independent films
1990s English-language films
1990s American films
English-language drama films